Popovo Municipality is a municipality (obshtina) in Targovishte Province, Northeastern Bulgaria, located in the eastern part of the Danubian Plain. It is named after its administrative centre - the town of Popovo.

The Hemus motorway is planned to cross the southern part of the area.

Settlements 

Popovo Municipality includes the following 34 places (towns are shown in bold):

Demography 
The following table shows the change of the population during the last four decades. Since 1992 Popovo Municipality has comprised the former municipalities of Sadina and Voditsa and the numbers in the table reflect this unification.

Ethnic composition
According to the 2011 census, among those who answered the optional question on ethnic identification, the ethnic composition of the municipality was the following:

Religion
According to the latest Bulgarian census of 2011, the religious composition, among those who answered the optional question on religious identification, was the following:

See also
Provinces of Bulgaria
Municipalities of Bulgaria
List of cities and towns in Bulgaria

References

External links
 Official website 

Municipalities in Targovishte Province